Orion Technical College is a private for-profit technical college in Davenport, Iowa.

History 
Hamilton Technical College was founded in 1969 by Charles and Maryanne Hamilton as the Academy of Radio and Television (A.R.T.) in Bettendorf, IA.  The first classes were held for six students around the dinner table of the Hamiltons and the first curriculum was focused on passing the Federal Communications Commission (FCC) exam.  Curriculum was then expanded to prepare students to become broadcasters. The first formal classes began in 1970 at 1120 State Street in Bettendorf, IA. To accommodate a growing number of students, classes were moved to a larger building on State Street. 
In 1978 an Electronics program was added and A.R.T acquired recognition as a Technical College specializing in Electronics Engineering Technology. The school was then renamed A.R.T. Technical College. The Electronics Engineering program offered was for an associate degree attainable in just 18 months. In 1980 the name was changed to Hamilton Technical College. 
From 1980-1991 there were many changes. An Aviation Maintenance Technology program was added, with classes being held at the Davenport Municipal Airport in Mt. Joy, IA. The Hamilton Institute of Business, a branch of Hamilton Tech began offering an Associate of Occupational Technology degree in Computer Information Systems. 
In 1990, Hamilton began the Computer-Aided Drafting program offering an Associate of Occupational Studies in 19 months. 
In 1991, Hamilton Technical College moved all classes to their current location at 10111 53rd St, Davenport, IA.  This year the Aerotech program also ended. Also in 1991, the Medical Assisting Technology program began which earned students a diploma in just 9 months.

In the summer of 2006 Hamilton Technical College began construction and remodeling of the current buildings. The building at the East end has been renovated to house the Advanced Electronics Center. Many equipment improvements have been made in this area. Some of the equipment that was added include: CNC Lathe, Mill, Industrial Robotics, Oscilloscopes, and computer testing equipment. The West end of the building currently houses the Medical Assisting program as well as the Development Center.

Currently, Hamilton Technical College offers an Associate and Bachelor of Science Degrees in Electronics Engineering Technology, a diploma in Medical Assisting Technology and a diploma in Medical Insurance Coding and Billing.

Sometime in 2020, Hamilton Technical College changed their name to Orion Technical College. With this name change also brings along the addition of a sister campus known as the Orion Institute in Toledo, Ohio.

In 2021, they moved into the old Gander Mountain building, also in Davenport, leaving their old campus behind.

Students and faculty 
Orion Technical College has approximately 300 students. There are approximately 25 full-time staff and 5 part-time staff.

Academics 
The Electronics Engineering Technology program offers either an Associates or a Bachelor's degree program. Medical Assisting is a ten-month diploma program and Medical Insurance Billing and Coding Specialist Program is also a ten-month diploma program. Both day and night programs are offered.

Orion is accredited by the Accrediting Commission of Career Schools and Colleges (ACCSC).

Notable alumni
 Paula Sands - KWQC-TV anchor
 Spike O'Dell

Professional Memberships
 Better Business Bureau, Davenport
 National Student Employment Association
 Association on Higher Education and Disabilities
 Iowa Association of Life-Long Learning
 Iowa Quad City Chamber of Commerce, Davenport, Iowa
 United States Chamber of Commerce, Washington D.C.
 Bettendorf Chamber of Commerce, Bettendorf, Iowa
 National Association of Student Financial Aid Administrators
 National Association of Colleges and Employers
 Great River Human Resource Association
 National Center for Competency Testing
 American Society of Heating, Refrigerating, and Air-Conditioning Engineers
 Quad City Computer Society
 Electronics Technicians Association International, Iowa State University, Ames, Iowa
 Robotics International of the Society of Manufacturing Engineers, Davenport/Rock Island Chapter
 American Association of Medical Assistants
 Multi-Skilled Medical Professional’s Association

References

External links 
 Official website

Private universities and colleges in Iowa
Education in Davenport, Iowa
Technical schools